This is a list of seasons played by F.C. Copenhagen in Danish and European football, from 1992 (when Copenhagen were found) to the present day. It details the club's achievements in major competitions, and the top scorers for each season.

Seasons

Footnotes

References

Seasons
 
Copenhagen
F.C. Copenhagen
F.C. Copenhagen